Takedown: Red Sabre is a tactical shooter video game developed by Serellan and published by 505 Games for Microsoft Windows and Xbox 360. It was released on September 20, 2013 for Windows via Steam and on February 21, 2014 for Xbox 360 via Xbox Live Arcade.

Gameplay 

Takedown: Red Sabre is a first-person shooter and a tactical shooter, which aims to be a realistic squad-based shooter. It is considered by the developer to be a spiritual successor to the original Tom Clancy's Rainbow Six and SWAT series of games.  It supports single player, co-operative play, and adversarial multiplayer gametypes.

Development

Successful Kickstarter campaign 
Following the success of other crowdfunding campaigns on Kickstarter, Serellan launched its own appeal on March 2, 2012 on the same website, with a $200,000 goal. This sum was a starting basis in order to bring the game into an alpha phase, so the project could be presented to publishers in a playable form, and to persuade private investors to show that the tactical shooter market is attractive and is still a viable industry. After a slow start (having only raised a third of the demanded sum one week before the deadline), the Kickstarter campaign gained momentum quickly on the final days following a revamping of the campaign and a cinematic video, and finally crossed the mark in the very last hours, ending at $221,833 in total pledges from 5,423 backers on April 1, 2012. One notable backer was the former community manager of Infinity Ward, Robert Bowling, who made the promotion of the campaign on Twitter. Every backer benefited from an access to a special forum section on the Serellan's website where they could participate into the game's development, by bringing ideas, participating to some decisions, and submitting content.

Partnership with 505 Games 
On February 15, 2013, Serellan announced their partnership with the publisher 505 Games, and announced the release of the game for PC and Xbox 360 for the end of the year, and the PlayStation 3 version being available later. The game was then presented behind closed doors for the first time in playable form at the Electronic Entertainment Expo 2013, in the 505 Games booth.

Reception 

Takedown received overwhelmingly negative reviews. Critics focused on its unfinished state, numerous bugs and glitches, and weak multiplayer offerings. Brett Todd of GameSpot gave it a 2 out of 10, concluding: "This is a game that should not have been released in its current state, and is certainly not one you should waste your time and money on."

References

External links 
 
 
 

2013 video games
505 Games games
Kickstarter-funded video games
Crowdfunded video games
PlayStation Network games
Tactical shooter video games
Unreal Engine games
Video games developed in the United States
Windows games
Xbox 360 Live Arcade games
Multiplayer and single-player video games